Michael Nathaniel Oliphant (born May 19, 1963) is a former American football running back in the National Football League (NFL) for the Washington Redskins and Cleveland Browns.  He also played in the Canadian Football League (CFL) for the Sacramento Gold Miners and the Winnipeg Blue Bombers.

Early life
Oliphant was born in Jacksonville, Florida.  He attended Auburn Senior High School in Auburn, Washington, then transferred to Federal Way High School in Federal Way, Washington midway through his junior year.  He did not play varsity high school football.

College career
Oliphant played college football at the NAIA Division I University of Puget Sound, where he was a NAIA All-American in 1986. That year, he also set school records for most points scored in one game and most points scored in a season. Oliphant graduated in 1988.

Professional career
Oliphant was selected in the third round of the 1988 NFL Draft by the Washington Redskins.  He was then traded to the Cleveland Browns in 1989 for Earnest Byner.  He was in Cleveland for three seasons, spending all of 1990 and 12 games of 1991 on injured-reserve status with hamstring injuries.  He was signed by the Seattle Seahawks in 1992, but was released before the start of the season.  He finished his career in the CFL with the Sacramento Gold Miners and the Winnipeg Blue Bombers.

References

External links
 

1963 births
Living people
American football running backs
Cleveland Browns players
Puget Sound Loggers football players
Sacramento Gold Miners players
Winnipeg Blue Bombers players
Washington Redskins players
Players of American football from Jacksonville, Florida